Hauss is a surname. Notable people with the surname include:

 Alberto Hauss, a German composer and producer
 David Hauss, a French triathlete
 Len Hauss (1942–2021), American football center
 Marcel Hauss, a World War I flying ace
 René Hauss, a former French footballer and coach

See also
Haus § People